Questworld is a boxed supplement published by Chaosium in 1982 for the fantasy tabletop role-playing game RuneQuest.

Description
In 1978, Chaosium created the fantasy role-playing game RuneQuest, and used Greg Stafford's mythical world of Glorantha as the official setting. Stafford tightly controlled material proposed for Glorantha, editing or vetoing material that did not match "the complex Gloranthan cosmology, theology, biology, sociology, and politics." In an article in Different Worlds in 1981, Stafford and co-author Lynn Abbey wrote, "Glorantha is a closed world, and is intended to stay that way." Chaosium recognized the need for a more "open" world if RuneQuest was to expand its market share, and the result was a product called Questworld, where writers would be free to create RuneQuest material without Stafford's oversight. As Stafford wrote, "QuestWorld is intended to be an open campaign world for RuneQuest and its variants... Chaosium will minimally direct the development of this planet, intending it to serve as an example of an open world in the same way that Glorantha has been our example of a closed world."

Publication history
Questworld was written by John E. Boyle, Mark Florio, Rick Goldberg, Mark Harmon, Janet Kirby, Alan LaVergne, Greg Stafford, and Michael Trout, with art by Luise Perenne. It contains 
 an 8-page introductory booklet
 three booklets, each containing three linked adventures:
 Candlefire
 Greenwald Tales
 Lord Skyppen's Mansion
 two maps
 a reference sheet.

Reception
In the April 1983 edition of Dragon (Issue #72), Ken Rolston noted that although the materials were professionally produced, the writing "is a little more uneven than in several of the company’s other recent publications." He found the included scenarios to be "well written, carefully introduced, and coherently organized," although he found some of the adventures to be less compelling than others. He concluded "On balance, Questworld is a worthwhile purchase." 

In the July 1983 edition of White Dwarf (Issue #43), Oliver Dickinson had a lot of issues with the supplement. He criticized the lack of background detail, saying "Scarcely any detail of the history, population, etc., of Greenwald is provided, and the map shows a few major geographical features and a scattering of places, many not referred to anywhere in the text." He also noted the many errors, commenting, "The pack shows many signs of having been compiled in haste, without adequate editorial supervision." Finally Dickinson was not impressed with the quality of the nine adventures, saying, "All this might not matter so much if the actual adventures were really novel and interesting, but they are mostly conventional." He concluded by giving the supplement a below average rating of 6 out of 10, stating, "Any hope that Chaosium'''s first publication on its own continent, Kanos, would give a lead in exploiting the new freedom will (it pains me to write it) be disappointed."

Other reviewsFantasy Gamer'' #1 (Aug./Sept., 1983)

References

Role-playing game supplements introduced in 1982
RuneQuest 2nd edition supplements